The 1993 Detroit Lions season was the 64th season in franchise history. The Lions improved from the 1992 season, and finished 10-6 and winning the NFC Central Division for the second time in three years.

In the playoffs, the Lions were upset in the Wild Card Round at home to the Green Bay Packers on a Brett Favre 40-yard touchdown pass to Sterling Sharpe with 55 seconds left.

The 1993 season was the last time they would win the NFC Central and is, as of 2023, their last division championship.

Offseason

NFL Draft 

Notes

 Detroit traded its first- and fourth-round selections (8th and 89th) to New Orleans in exchange for LB Pat Swilling.
 Detroit traded up from its second-round selection (36th) with the N.Y. Jets for the Jets' second-round selection (33rd), giving up its fifth-round selection (120th).
 Detroit received Cleveland's third-round selection (68th) in return for DT Jerry Ball.

Personnel

Staff

Roster

Regular season

Schedule

Season summary

Week 1 

    
    
    
    
    
    
    
    
    

 Source: Pro-Football-Reference.com

Week 2

Week 3

Week 4

Standings

Playoffs

NFC Wild Card Game: vs Green Bay Packers

Awards and records 
 Jason Hanson, Club Record, 34 Field Goals in One Season.

References

External links 
 1993 Detroit Lions at Pro-Football-Reference.com

Detroit Lions
NFC Central championship seasons
Detroit Lions seasons
Detroit Lions